Aoteadrillia consequens is an extinct species of sea snail, a marine gastropod mollusk in the family Horaiclavidae.

Description
The length of the shell attains 8 mm (estimated), its diameter 3 mm.

Distribution
This extinct marine species was endemic to New Zealand and was found in the fossiliferous beds at Kaawa Creek.

References

 Laws, Charles Reed. "The Waitotaran Faunule at Kaawa Creek." part 2; Royal Society of New Zealand, 1936
 Maxwell, P.A. (2009). Cenozoic Mollusca. pp. 232–254 in Gordon, D.P. (ed.) New Zealand inventory of biodiversity. Volume one. Kingdom Animalia: Radiata, Lophotrochozoa, Deuterostomia. Canterbury University Press, Christchurch.

consequens
Gastropods of New Zealand
Gastropods described in 1936